Prince Dipangkorn Rasmijoti Sirivibulyarajakumar (born 29 April 2005; ;) is a member of the country's Chakri dynasty and heir presumptive to the throne of Thailand. He is the fifth son and seventh and youngest child of King Vajiralongkorn; his mother is Srirasmi Suwadee, the king's third legal wife. His father also has a daughter by his first wife, and five children (four sons and a daughter) by his second wife; all the children of the second wife were born before the then-Crown Prince married their mother but were legitimised by their marriage. After the Crown Prince divorced his second wife in 1996, he disowned their four sons, leaving Dipangkorn as the only son recognised by the king.

Early life and education
Prince Dipangkorn Rasmijoti was born by Caesarean section on 29 April 2005 at Siriraj Hospital in Bangkok. On 15 June 2005, King Bhumibol Adulyadej proclaimed the prince's name.

The prince is styled His Royal Highness. A royal ceremony, called Phra Ratchaphithi Somphot Duean Lae Khuen Phra U, to celebrate the prince's first month was held on 17 June 2005 at Ananta Samakhom Throne Hall in Bangkok.

Position in the line of succession
Prince Dipangkorn is the heir presumptive to his father and first in line to the throne as the only officially recognised son of King Vajiralongkorn.  However, because of Vajiralongkorn's December 2014 divorce from Srirasmi Suwadee, Dipangkorn's position in the line of succession is uncertain. The 1924 Palace Law of Succession lists "the order in the line of succession", following the first-born son of the king to be "the first-born son of the said prince and his royal consort" followed by "younger sons, in order, of the said prince and his royal consort." When Vajiralongkorn ended his relationship with his second wife in 1996, he disowned their four sons and said they had renounced their royal titles. However, the Royal Palace continued to recognize their right to use the style HSH, or His Serene Highness.

Prince Dipangkorn's position is also uncertain because a 1974 constitutional amendment allows princesses to succeed the throne in the absence of an appointed successor. Princess Bajrakitiyabha, the second presumptive heir in line to the throne based on the 1924 Palace Law of Succession and eldest daughter of the king, is widely assumed to be the next person in line.

Titles, honours and symbols

Titles and styles
 29 April 2005 – present: His Royal Highness Prince Dipangkorn Rasmijoti of Thailand
 29 April 2005 – 5 May 2019: (พระเจ้าหลานเธอ พระองค์เจ้าทีปังกรรัศมีโชติ Phrachao Lan Thoe Phra Ong Chao Dipangkorn Rasmijoti)
 5 May 2019 – present: (สมเด็จพระเจ้าลูกยาเธอ เจ้าฟ้าทีปังกรรัศมีโชติ Somdet Phrachao Lukya Thoe Chaofa Dipangkorn Rasmijoti)

Royal decorations
2019 -  Knight of the Most Illustrious Order of the Royal House of Chakri

2016 -  King Rama IX Royal Cypher Medal (First Class)

2019 -  King Rama X Royal Cypher Medal (First Class)
Symbols

Ancestry

References

External links

 Photographs of the prince's first year 
 The prince's first day of preschool

|-

|-}

2005 births
Living people
Thai male Chao Fa
21st-century Chakri dynasty
Mahidol family
People from Bangkok
Thai people of Mon descent
Thai male Phra Ong Chao
Children of Vajiralongkorn
Sons of kings
Heirs presumptive